Jonathan Gallivan (born in Toronto, Ontario) is a Québec-based producer, musician, and multi-media developer for Gallivan Media.

He co-founded the band My Brilliant Beast with Byron Kent Wong and Julia Galios in 1993. For 1995, My Brilliant Beast's song Fall Away, from their self-titled EP, was a Top 30 hit on Canadian radio.

He joined Random Media Core Inc. in 1993, a Canadian company dedicated to music, design, marketing, and new media. At the company, Jonathan developed the original "welcome" page for the launching of the Sympatico ISP, as well as the original website for TV Guide in Canada.

In 2005, Jonathan composed the songs Blunt Like Solid (recorded by Dubtractive) and I Want You To Love Me (But You Just Let Me Go) (recorded by Jonny Gee Rogers) for Clement Virgo's film Lie With Me. He also co-wrote the song The Figure It Ate (recorded by Pong Console) with Byron Kent Wong, the film's composer, who was nominated for a Genie Award for the score.

Jonathan produced, recorded and engineered an acoustic album for David Usher called "The Mile End Sessions", which was released September 14, 2010. Previously, he recorded, engineered and co-produced Wake Up And Say Goodbye. He also produced, recorded, engineered and mixed David Usher's solo album, Songs from the Last Day on Earth, which was released on October 2, 2012.

Jonathan joined the band Moist as guitarist and background vocalist for their record Glory Under Dangerous Skies, which was released in September 2014.

Awards and recognition
 2008 — Juno Award Nominee – Pop Album of the Year, co-producer/performer on the David Usher album Wake Up And Say Goodbye
 2008 — SOCAN Pop Music Award for the song The Music by David Usher
 2007 — SOCAN Number 1 award in recognition of The Music, by David Usher, reaching Number 1 on MuchMoreMusic's Countdown Chart

References

External links
Official Website
Jonathan Gallivan ReverbNation
Jonathan Gallivan Facebook musician profile
Website of the Mighty Pirates rec league hockey team, maintained by Gallivan

Living people
Canadian record producers
Musicians from Toronto
1972 births